Chile competed at the 2012 Winter Youth Olympics in Innsbruck, Austria. The Chilean team consisted of 5 athletes competed in 3 different sports.

Alpine skiing

Chile qualified one boy and girl in alpine skiing. 

Boy

Girl

Freestyle skiing

Ski cross
Chile qualified one boy and girl in the ski cross competitions. 

Boy

Girl

Snowboarding

Chile qualified one boy in snowboarding.

Boy

See also
Chile at the 2012 Summer Olympics

References

2012 in Chilean sport
Nations at the 2012 Winter Youth Olympics
Chile at the Youth Olympics